Ehugbo often referred to as  Afikpo, is the second largest urban area in Ebonyi State, Nigeria. It is the headquarters of the Afikpo North Local Government Area.

It is situated in the southern part of Ebonyi State and is bordered to the north by the town of Akpoha, to the south by Unwana, to the south west by Edda LGA, to the east by the Cross River State and to the west by Amasiri town. It is located on 6 degrees north latitude and 8 degrees east longitude.

The population of Afikpo is estimated at 156,611, according to the Nigerian 2006 Census.

Climate
Köppen-Geiger climate classification system classifies its climate as tropical wet and dry (Aw).

See also 
Igbo people
Okumkpa, African dance of Igbo Afikpo tribes

References 

Cities in Ebonyi State